National Airlines was a United States low-fare airline that operated from 1999 to 2002. Headquartered in Las Vegas, Nevada, it was the third US carrier to use the name. The airline was created to bring tourists to Las Vegas. National offered service to a limited number of cities with high traffic to Las Vegas. The airline operated a fleet of 19 Boeing 757-200 jets in a two-class first class and coach seating configuration.

History 
Hoping to attract more visitors from the East Coast, Harrah's Entertainment and the former Rio Hotel & Casino, Inc., each contributed $15 million toward the start-up costs of National Airlines in July 1998. Wexford Capital, owners of Republic Airways Holdings also contributed several million to this create the airline.

Taking a page from Southwest Airlines' book, National kept things simple by operating a single aircraft type—in National's case, the Boeing 757.

Service began on May 27, 1999. This was the third airline in the United States to use the National Airlines name. Michael Conway became President and CEO of the company. From its inception, the company fought an uphill battle against rising fuel costs and an economic recession. National Airlines filed for Chapter 11 bankruptcy protection on December 6, 2000.

Like many other airlines, National had serious financial problems after the September 11 attacks in 2001, and only 41 months after their inaugural flight left Las Vegas' McCarran International Airport, the airline ceased all operations on November 6, 2002, after being in Chapter 11 bankruptcy for 23 months.

As of the day of National's grounding on November 6, 2002, the airline had carried 1.85 million passengers through McCarran (January–November 2002), and National was the airport's fourth-largest carrier based upon passenger volume. Departing McCarran International Airport at 4:20 p.m., National Airlines Flight 354 to Dallas/Fort Worth was the carrier's last to leave the Las Vegas hub.

Destinations 

At the time National Airlines was grounded, the airline provided service to 14 destinations throughout the United States:

United States

California 
Los Angeles (Los Angeles International Airport) 
San Francisco (San Francisco International Airport)

District of Columbia 
See Virginia for Washington, D.C. service

Florida 
Miami (Miami International Airport)

Illinois 
Chicago
(Chicago Midway International Airport)
(Chicago O'Hare International Airport)

New Jersey 
Newark (Newark Liberty International Airport)

New York 
New York (John F. Kennedy International Airport)

Nevada 
Las Vegas (McCarran International Airport) Hub
Reno (Reno-Tahoe International Airport)

Pennsylvania 
Philadelphia (Philadelphia International Airport)

Texas 
Dallas/Fort Worth (Dallas/Fort Worth International Airport)

Virginia 
Arlington (Ronald Reagan Washington National Airport)
Dulles (Washington Dulles International Airport)

Washington 
Seattle (Seattle-Tacoma International Airport)

Fleet 
At the time the airline was grounded, National had 19 aircraft in its fleet consisting of: 

The 757s were sold, eight of them under a new registration number.

See also 
 List of defunct airlines of the United States

References

External links
 National Airlines Home page(5/10/00)
 Site after shut down

Defunct airlines of the United States
Airlines established in 1999
Airlines disestablished in 2002
Companies that filed for Chapter 11 bankruptcy in 2000
Defunct low-cost airlines
Companies based in the Las Vegas Valley
Defunct companies based in Nevada
1999 establishments in Nevada